FIFA World Cup songs and anthems are tunes and songs adopted officially by FIFA (or by official broadcasters and partners selected by FIFA), to be used prior to the World Cup event and to accompany the championships during the event. They are also used in advertising campaigns for the World Cup. They are used as theme music in TV broadcast and also used in advertising campaigns for the World Cup. Some songs and anthems are more popular and famous than official songs and anthems.

The chosen songs are usually multilingual and include English, the official language of the organizing country, languages of certain FIFA Partners regions and/or other languages. The main versions also result in cover versions in many other languages performed by the original or by local artists.

Official songs and anthems by FIFA

Other songs and anthems

Broadcaster theme music

Entrance music

Official albums 
 1994 – Gloryland World Cup USA 94
 1998 – Music of the World Cup: Allez! Ola! Ole!
 2002 – The Official Album of the 2002 FIFA World Cup
 2006 – Voices from the FIFA World Cup
 2010 – Listen Up! The Official 2010 FIFA World Cup Album
 2014 – One Love, One Rhythm – The 2014 FIFA World Cup Official Album 
 2018 – Unissued (There was a playlist of songs: FIFA World Cup Russia 2018 Official Playlist)
 2022 – FIFA World Cup Qatar 2022 Official Soundtrack

See also 
 List of UEFA European Championship songs and anthems
 List of Copa América songs and anthems
 List of Africa Cup of Nations songs and anthems
 List of AFC Asian Cup songs and anthems
 List of Olympic songs and anthems

Notes

References 

Official songs